
Gmina Górzno is a rural gmina (administrative district) in Garwolin County, Masovian Voivodeship, in east-central Poland. Its seat is the village of Górzno, which lies approximately 8 kilometres (5 mi) south-east of Garwolin and 64 km (40 mi) south-east of Warsaw.

Villages
Gmina Górzno contains the villages and settlements of Chęciny, Gąsów, Górzno, Górzno-Kolonia, Goździk, Józefów, Kobyla Wola, Łąki, Mierzączka, Piaski, Potaszniki, Reducin, Samorządki, Unin and Wólka Ostrożeńska.

Neighbouring gminas
Gmina Górzno is bordered by the town of Garwolin and by the gminas of Borowie, Garwolin, Łaskarzew, Miastków Kościelny, Sobolew and Żelechów.

References
 Polish official population figures 2006

Gorzno
Garwolin County